Edna Skinner (May 23, 1921 – August 8, 2003) was an American film and television actress notable for playing Kay Addison, neighbor of Wilbur Post, in the iconic TV series Mister Ed.  Her character was replaced months after her onscreen husband (Larry Keating) died; according to Alan Young in his Archive of American Television interview, the writers tried to make her a widow on the show, but finally decided to bring in another married couple, Gordon and Winnie Kirkwood, played by Leon Ames and Florence MacMichael, and Edna Skinner had to leave the show.
Edna grew up in Fulton, NY, getting her start in acting by starring in local plays.

Skinner retired from acting in 1964 and was later a noted authority on fly fishing. She died of heart failure at her home in North Bend, Oregon on August 8, 2003, at the age of 82.

Filmography

References

External links

 
 
 

1921 births
2003 deaths
Actresses from Washington, D.C.
American film actresses
American television actresses
20th-century American actresses
People from North Bend, Oregon
21st-century American women